The 2022–23 season is the 111th season in the existence of Cambridge United Football Club and the club's second consecutive season in League One. In addition to the league, they will also compete in the 2022–23 FA Cup, the 2022–23 EFL Cup and the 2022–23 EFL Trophy.

Transfers

In

Out

Loans in

Loans out

Pre-season and friendlies
On 30 May, Cambridge United announced their first two pre-season friendlies, against Cardiff City and Norwich City. A third friendly at a neutral ground against Notts County was later confirmed. On June 16, another home friendly was confirmed, against Hull City.

Competitions

Overall record

League One

League table

Results summary

Results by round

Matches

On 23 June, the league fixtures were announced.

FA Cup

The U's were drawn away to Curzon Ashton in the first round.

EFL Cup

Cambridge were drawn at home to Millwall in the first round and to Southampton in the second round.

EFL Trophy

On 20 June, the initial Group stage draw was made, grouping Cambridge United with Ipswich Town and Northampton Town.

References

Cambridge United
Cambridge United F.C. seasons
English football clubs 2022–23 season